This article describes the mathematics of the Standard Model of particle physics, a gauge quantum field theory containing the internal symmetries of the unitary product group . The theory is commonly viewed as describing the fundamental set of particles – the leptons, quarks, gauge bosons and the Higgs boson.

The Standard Model is renormalizable and mathematically self-consistent, however despite having huge and continued successes in providing experimental predictions it does leave some unexplained phenomena. In particular, although the physics of special relativity is incorporated, general relativity is not, and the Standard Model will fail at energies or distances where the graviton is expected to emerge. Therefore, in a modern field theory context, it is seen as an effective field theory.

Quantum field theory

The standard model is a quantum field theory, meaning its fundamental objects are quantum fields which are defined at all points in spacetime. These fields are
 the fermion fields, which account for "matter particles";
 the gluon field, ; and
 the Higgs field, .
That these are quantum rather than classical fields has the mathematical consequence that they are operator-valued. In particular, values of the fields generally do not commute. As operators, they act upon a quantum state (ket vector).

Alternative presentations of the fields
As is common in quantum theory, there is more than one way to look at things. At first the basic fields given above may not seem to correspond well with the "fundamental particles" in the chart above, but there are several alternative presentations which, in particular contexts, may be more appropriate than those that are given above.

Fermions
Rather than having one fermion field , it can be split up into separate components for each type of particle. The quarks add still further components. In order to be four-spinors like the electron and other lepton components, there must be one quark component for every combination of flavour and colour, bringing the total to 24 (3 for charged leptons, 3 for neutrinos, and 2·3·3 = 18 for quarks). Each of these is a four component bispinor, for a total of 96 complex-valued components for the fermion field.

If  is thought of as an  matrix then  should be thought of as a  matrix.

A chiral theory
"Left" chirality:  
"Right" chirality:  
where  is the fifth gamma matrix. This is very important in the Standard Model because left and right chirality components are treated differently by the gauge interactions.

Put more simply, the weak interaction could rotate e.g. a left-handed electron into a left-handed neutrino (with emission of a ), but could not do so with the same right-handed particles. As an aside, the right-handed neutrino originally did not exist in the standard model – but the discovery of neutrino oscillation implies that neutrinos must have mass, and since chirality can change during the propagation of a massive particle, right-handed neutrinos must exist in reality. This does not however change the (experimentally-proven) chiral nature of the weak interaction.

Mass and interaction eigenstates
A distinction can thus be made between, for example, the mass and interaction eigenstates of the neutrino. The former is the state which propagates in free space, whereas the latter is the different state that participates in interactions. Which is the "fundamental" particle? For the neutrino, it is conventional to define the "flavour" (or ) by the interaction eigenstate, whereas for the quarks we define the flavour (up, down, etc.) by the mass state. We can switch between these states using the CKM matrix for the quarks, or the PMNS matrix for the neutrinos (the charged leptons on the other hand are eigenstates of both mass and flavour).

As an aside, if a complex phase term exists within either of these matrices, it will give rise to direct CP violation, which could explain the dominance of matter over antimatter in our current universe. This has been proven for the CKM matrix, and is expected for the PMNS matrix.

Positive and negative energies
Finally, the quantum fields are sometimes decomposed into "positive" and "negative" energy parts: . This is not so common when a quantum field theory has been set up, but often features prominently in the process of quantizing a field theory.

Bosons

Due to the Higgs mechanism, the electroweak boson fields , and  "mix" to create the states which are physically observable. To retain gauge invariance, the underlying fields must be massless, but the observable states can gain masses in the process. These states are:

The massive neutral (Z) boson:
 
The massless neutral boson:
 
The massive charged W bosons:
 
where  is the Weinberg angle.

The  field is the photon, which corresponds classically to the well-known electromagnetic four-potential – i.e. the electric and magnetic fields. The  field actually contributes in every process the photon does, but due to its large mass, the contribution is usually negligible.

Perturbative QFT and the interaction picture
Much of the qualitative descriptions of the standard model in terms of "particles" and "forces" comes from the perturbative quantum field theory view of the model. In this, the Lagrangian is decomposed as  into separate free field and interaction Lagrangians. The free fields care for particles in isolation, whereas processes involving several particles arise through interactions. The idea is that the state vector should only change when particles interact, meaning a free particle is one whose quantum state is constant. This corresponds to the interaction picture in quantum mechanics.

In the more common Schrödinger picture, even the states of free particles change over time: typically the phase changes at a rate which depends on their energy. In the alternative Heisenberg picture, state vectors are kept constant, at the price of having the operators (in particular the observables) be time-dependent. The interaction picture constitutes an intermediate between the two, where some time dependence is placed in the operators (the quantum fields) and some in the state vector. In QFT, the former is called the free field part of the model, and the latter is called the interaction part. The free field model can be solved exactly, and then the solutions to the full model can be expressed as perturbations of the free field solutions, for example using the Dyson series.

It should be observed that the decomposition into free fields and interactions is in principle arbitrary. For example, renormalization in QED modifies the mass of the free field electron to match that of a physical electron (with an electromagnetic field), and will in doing so add a term to the free field Lagrangian which must be cancelled by a counterterm in the interaction Lagrangian, that then shows up as a two-line vertex in the Feynman diagrams. This is also how the Higgs field is thought to give particles mass: the part of the interaction term which corresponds to the nonzero vacuum expectation value of the Higgs field is moved from the interaction to the free field Lagrangian, where it looks just like a mass term having nothing to do with the Higgs field.

Free fields
Under the usual free/interaction decomposition, which is suitable for low energies, the free fields obey the following equations:
 The fermion field  satisfies the Dirac equation;  for each type  of fermion.
 The photon field  satisfies the wave equation .
 The Higgs field  satisfies the Klein–Gordon equation.
 The weak interaction fields  satisfy the Proca equation.
These equations can be solved exactly. One usually does so by considering first solutions that are periodic with some period  along each spatial axis; later taking the limit:  will lift this periodicity restriction.

In the periodic case, the solution for a field  (any of the above) can be expressed as a Fourier series of the form

where:
Different fields have different "a-" and "b-particles".
  is the four-momentum for a quantum with momentum .  denotes an inner product of four-vectors.
In the limit , the sum would turn into an integral with help from the  hidden inside .

Technically,  is the Hermitian adjoint of the operator  in the inner product space of ket vectors. For these derivations, one starts out with expressions for the operators in terms of the quantum fields.

Interaction terms and the path integral approach
The Lagrangian can also be derived without using creation and annihilation operators (the "canonical" formalism) by using a path integral formulation, pioneered by Feynman building on the earlier work of Dirac. Feynman diagrams are pictorial representations of interaction terms. A quick derivation is indeed presented at the article on Feynman diagrams.

Lagrangian formalism

We can now give some more detail about the aforementioned free and interaction terms appearing in the Standard Model Lagrangian density. Any such term must be both gauge and reference-frame invariant, otherwise the laws of physics would depend on an arbitrary choice or the frame of an observer. Therefore, the global Poincaré symmetry, consisting of translational symmetry, rotational symmetry and the inertial reference frame invariance central to the theory of special relativity must apply. The local  gauge symmetry is the internal symmetry. The three factors of the gauge symmetry together give rise to the three fundamental interactions, after some appropriate relations have been defined, as we shall see.

Kinetic terms
A free particle can be represented by a mass term, and a kinetic term which relates to the "motion" of the fields.

Fermion fields
The kinetic term for a Dirac fermion is

where the notations are carried from earlier in the article.  can represent any, or all, Dirac fermions in the standard model. Generally, as below, this term is included within the couplings (creating an overall "dynamical" term).

Gauge fields
For the spin-1 fields, first define the field strength tensor

for a given gauge field (here we use ), with gauge coupling constant . The quantity  is the structure constant of the particular gauge group, defined by the commutator

where  are the generators of the group. In an Abelian (commutative) group (such as the  we use here) the structure constants vanish, since the generators  all commute with each other. Of course, this is not the case in general – the standard model includes the non-Abelian  and  groups (such groups lead to what is called a Yang–Mills gauge theory).

We need to introduce three gauge fields corresponding to each of the subgroups .
The strong coupling constant is conventionally labelled  (or simply  where there is no ambiguity). The observations leading to the discovery of this part of the Standard Model are discussed in the article in quantum chromodynamics.
 The notation  will be used for the gauge field tensor of  where  runs over the  generators of this group. The coupling can be denoted  or again simply .

The kinetic term can now be written as

Coupling terms
The next step is to "couple" the gauge fields to the fermions, allowing for interactions.

Electroweak sector

The electroweak sector interacts with the symmetry group , where the subscript L indicates coupling only to left-handed fermions.

Note that we have to redefine a new  symmetry of weak hypercharge, different from QED, in order to achieve the unification with the weak force. The electric charge , third component of weak isospin  (also called  or ) and weak hypercharge  are related by

(or by the alternative  convention ). The first convention, used in this article, is equivalent to the earlier Gell-Mann–Nishijima formula.  It makes the hypercharge be twice the average charge of a given isomultiplet.

One may then define the conserved current for weak isospin as

and for weak hypercharge as

where  is the electric current and  the third weak isospin current. As explained above, these currents mix to create the physically observed bosons, which also leads to testable relations between the coupling constants.

To explain this in a simpler way, we can see the effect of the electroweak interaction by picking out terms from the Lagrangian.

where the particles are understood to be left-handed, and where

The  symmetry, on the other hand, is similar to electromagnetism, but acts on all "weak hypercharged" fermions (both left- and right-handed) via the neutral , as well as the charged fermions via the photon.

Quantum chromodynamics sector

Since leptons do not interact with gluons, they are not affected by this sector. The Dirac Lagrangian of the quarks coupled to the gluon fields is given by

Mass terms and the Higgs mechanism

Mass terms
This can be seen by writing  in terms of left and right-handed components (skipping the actual calculation):

We see that the mass-generating interaction is achieved by constant flipping of particle chirality. The spin-half particles have no right/left chirality pair with the same  representations and equal and opposite weak hypercharges, so assuming these gauge charges are conserved in the vacuum, none of the spin-half particles could ever swap chirality, and must remain massless. Additionally, we know experimentally that the W and Z bosons are massive, but a boson mass term contains the combination e.g. , which clearly depends on the choice of gauge. Therefore, none of the standard model fermions or bosons can "begin" with mass, but must acquire it by some other mechanism.

The Higgs mechanism

The solution to both these problems comes from the Higgs mechanism, which involves scalar fields (the number of which depend on the exact form of Higgs mechanism) which (to give the briefest possible description) are "absorbed" by the massive bosons as degrees of freedom, and which couple to the fermions via Yukawa coupling to create what looks like mass terms.

In the Standard Model, the Higgs field is a complex scalar field of the group :

where the superscripts  and  indicate the electric charge of the components.

The Higgs part of the Lagrangian is

There is a parameter here, at first hidden within the shape of the potential, that is very important. In a unitarity gauge one can set  and make  real. Then  is the non-vanishing vacuum expectation value of the Higgs field.  has units of mass, and it is the only parameter in the Standard Model which is not dimensionless. It is also much smaller than the Planck scale and about twice the Higgs mass, setting the scale for the mass of all other particles in the Standard Model. This is the only real fine-tuning to a small nonzero value in the Standard Model.

The mass of the Higgs boson itself is given by

The Yukawa interaction terms are

Neutrino masses
As previously mentioned, evidence shows neutrinos must have mass. But within the standard model, the right-handed neutrino does not exist, so even with a Yukawa coupling neutrinos remain massless. An obvious solution is to simply add a right-handed neutrino  resulting in a Dirac mass term as usual. This field however must be a sterile neutrino, since being right-handed it experimentally belongs to an isospin singlet and also has charge , implying  (see above) i.e. it does not even participate in the weak interaction. The experimental evidence for sterile neutrinos is currently inconclusive.

Another possibility to consider is that the neutrino satisfies the Majorana equation, which at first seems possible due to its zero electric charge. In this case the mass term is

where  denotes a charge conjugated (i.e. anti-) particle, and the terms are consistently all left (or all right) chirality (note that a left-chirality projection of an antiparticle is a right-handed field; care must be taken here due to different notations sometimes used). Here we are essentially flipping between left-handed neutrinos and right-handed anti-neutrinos (it is furthermore possible but not necessary that neutrinos are their own antiparticle, so these particles are the same). However, for left-chirality neutrinos, this term changes weak hypercharge by 2 units – not possible with the standard Higgs interaction, requiring the Higgs field to be extended to include an extra triplet with weak hypercharge = 2 – whereas for right-chirality neutrinos, no Higgs extensions are necessary. For both left and right chirality cases, Majorana terms violate lepton number, but possibly at a level beyond the current sensitivity of experiments to detect such violations.

It is possible to include both Dirac and Majorana mass terms in the same theory, which (in contrast to the Dirac-mass-only approach) can provide a “natural” explanation for the smallness of the observed neutrino masses, by linking the right-handed neutrinos to yet-unknown physics around the GUT scale (see seesaw mechanism).

Since in any case new fields must be postulated to explain the experimental results, neutrinos are an obvious gateway to searching physics beyond the Standard Model.

Detailed information
This section provides more detail on some aspects, and some reference material. Explicit Lagrangian terms are also provided here.

Field content in detail
The Standard Model has the following fields. These describe one generation of leptons and quarks, and there are three generations, so there are three copies of each fermionic field. By CPT symmetry, there is a set of fermions and antifermions with opposite parity and charges. If a left-handed fermion spans some representation its antiparticle (right-handed antifermion) spans the dual representation (note that  for SU(2), because it is pseudo-real). The column "representation" indicates under which representations of the gauge groups that each field transforms, in the order (SU(3), SU(2), U(1)) and for the U(1) group, the value of the weak hypercharge is listed. There are twice as many left-handed lepton field components as right-handed lepton field components in each generation, but an equal number of left-handed quark and right-handed quark field components.

Fermion content
This table is based in part on data gathered by the Particle Data Group.

Free parameters
Upon writing the most general Lagrangian with massless neutrinos, one finds that the dynamics depend on 19 parameters, whose numerical values are established by experiment. Straightforward extensions of the Standard Model with massive neutrinos need 7 more parameters (3 masses and 4 PMNS matrix parameters) for a total of 26 parameters. The neutrino parameter values are still uncertain. The 19 certain parameters are summarized here.

{| class="wikitable collapsible collapsed"
! colspan="5"| Parameters of the Standard Model
|-
! Symbol
! Description
! Renormalization scheme (point)
! Value
! Experimental uncertainty
|-
|me
|Electron mass
|
|510.9989461(31) keV
|
|-
|mμ
|Muon mass
|
|105.6583745(24) MeV
|
|-
|mτ
|Tau mass
|
|1.77686(12) GeV
|
|-
|mu
|Up quark mass
|μ = 2 GeV
|2.16 MeV
| +0.49 −0.26 MeV
|-
|md
|Down quark mass
|μ = 2 GeV
|4.67 MeV
| +0.48 −0.17 MeV
|-
|ms
|Strange quark mass
|μ = 2 GeV
|93.4 MeV
| +8.6 −3.4 MeV
|-
|mc
|Charm quark mass
|μ = mc
|1.27 GeV
| ±0.02 GeV
|-
|mb
|Bottom quark mass
|μ = mb
|4.18 GeV
| +0.03 −0.02 GeV
|-
|mt
|Top quark mass
|On-shell scheme
|172.69 GeV
|±0.30 GeV
|-
|θ12
|CKM 12-mixing angle
|
|13.1°
|
|-
|θ23
|CKM 23-mixing angle
|
|2.4°
|
|-
|θ13
|CKM 13-mixing angle
|
|0.2°
|
|-
|δ
|CKM CP-violating Phase
|
|0.995
|
|-
|g1 or g|U(1) gauge coupling
|μ = mZ
|0.357
|
|-
|g2 or g
|SU(2) gauge coupling
|μ = mZ
|0.652
|
|-
|g3 or gs
|SU(3) gauge coupling
|μ = mZ
|1.221
|
|-
|θQCD
|QCD vacuum angle
|
|~0
|
|-
|v
|Higgs vacuum expectation value
|
|246.2196(2) GeV
|
|-
|mH
|Higgs mass
|
|125.18 GeV
|±0.16 GeV
|}

The choice of free parameters is somewhat arbitrary. Instead of fermion masses, dimensionless Yukawa couplings can be chosen as free parameters. Instead of the Higgs mass, the Higgs self-coupling strength , which is approximately 0.129, can be chosen as a free parameter. Instead of the Higgs vacuum expectation value, the  parameter directly from the Higgs self-interaction term  can be chosen.

The value of the vacuum energy (or more precisely, the renormalization scale used to calculate this energy) may also be treated as an additional free parameter. The renormalization scale may be identified with the Planck scale or fine-tuned to match the observed cosmological constant. However, both options are problematic.

Additional symmetries of the Standard Model
From the theoretical point of view, the Standard Model exhibits four additional global symmetries, not postulated at the outset of its construction, collectively denoted accidental symmetries, which are continuous U(1) global symmetries. The transformations leaving the Lagrangian invariant are:

The first transformation rule is shorthand meaning that all quark fields for all generations must be rotated by an identical phase simultaneously.

By Noether's theorem, each symmetry above has an associated conservation law: the conservation of baryon number, electron number, muon number, and tau number. Conservation of baryon number implies that the number of quarks minus the number of antiquarks is a constant. Within experimental limits, no violation of this conservation law has been found.

Similarly, each electron and its associated neutrino is assigned an electron number of +1, while the anti-electron and the associated anti-neutrino carry a −1 electron number. Similarly, the muons and their neutrinos are assigned a muon number of +1 and the tau leptons are assigned a tau lepton number of +1. The Standard Model predicts that each of these three numbers should be conserved separately in a manner similar to the way baryon number is conserved. These numbers are collectively known as lepton family numbers (LF). (This result depends on the assumption made in Standard Model that neutrinos are massless. Experimentally, neutrino oscillations demonstrate that individual electron, muon and tau numbers are not conserved.)The violation of lepton number and baryon number cancel each other out and in effect B − L is an exact symmetry of the Standard Model.

In addition to the accidental (but exact) symmetries described above, the Standard Model exhibits several approximate symmetries. These are the "SU(2) custodial symmetry" and the "SU(2) or SU(3) quark flavor symmetry."

The U(1) symmetry
For the leptons, the gauge group can be written . The two U(1) factors can be combined into  where l is the lepton number. Gauging of the lepton number is ruled out by experiment, leaving only the possible gauge group . A similar argument in the quark sector also gives the same result for the electroweak theory.

The charged and neutral current couplings and Fermi theory
The charged currents  are

These charged currents are precisely those that entered the Fermi theory of beta decay. The action contains the charge current piece

For energy much less than the mass of the W-boson, the effective theory becomes the current–current contact interaction of the Fermi theory, .

However, gauge invariance now requires that the component  of the gauge field also be coupled to a current that lies in the triplet of SU(2). However, this mixes with the U(1), and another current in that sector is needed. These currents must be uncharged in order to conserve charge. So neutral currents''' are also required,  

The neutral current piece in the Lagrangian is then

See also
Overview of Standard Model of particle physics
Fundamental interaction
Noncommutative standard model
Open questions: CP violation, Neutrino masses, Quark matter
Physics beyond the Standard Model
Strong interactions: Flavour, Quantum chromodynamics, Quark model
Weak interactions: Electroweak interaction, Fermi's interaction
Weinberg angle
Symmetry in quantum mechanics
Quantum Field Theory in a Nutshell by A. Zee

References and external linksAn introduction to quantum field theory, by M.E. Peskin and D.V. Schroeder (HarperCollins, 1995) .Gauge theory of elementary particle physics, by T.P. Cheng and L.F. Li (Oxford University Press, 1982) .
Standard Model Lagrangian with explicit Higgs terms (T.D. Gutierrez, ca 1999) (PDF, PostScript, and LaTeX version)The quantum theory of fields (vol 2), by S. Weinberg (Cambridge University Press, 1996) .Quantum Field Theory in a Nutshell (Second Edition), by A. Zee (Princeton University Press, 2010)  .An Introduction to Particle Physics and the Standard Model, by R. Mann (CRC Press, 2010) Physics From Symmetry'' by J. Schwichtenberg (Springer, 2015)  . Especially page 86

Standard Model
Electroweak theory